The 2023 BYU Cougars baseball team represents Brigham Young University during the 2023 NCAA Division I baseball season.  Trent Pratt acts as the new head coach of the BYU Cougars baseball team after taking over the interim duties last season.

The Cougars are competing as members of the WCC for the final season, as they'll join the Big 12 Conference for 2023. The Cougars enter the 2023 WCC season picked to finish third. They return 21 players from 2022.

2023 roster

Schedule 

! style=""| Regular Season
|- 

|- align="center" bgcolor="ccffc"
| February 17 ||  || – || J. C. Love Field at Pat Patterson Park || CUSA TV || 10–1 || Jack Sterner (1–0) || Jonathan Fincher (0–1) || None || 2,204 || 1–0 || –
|- align="center" bgcolor="ffbbb"
| February 18 ||  || – || J. C. Love Field at Pat Patterson Park || CUSA TV || 6–8 || Landon Tomkins (1–0) || Patton Gubler (0–1) || None || 1,917 || 1–1 || –
|- align="center" bgcolor="ccffc"
| February 18 ||  || – || J. C. Love Field at Pat Patterson Park || CUSA TV || 8–2 || Cutter Clawson (1–0) || Rawley Hector (0–1) || None || 1,917 || 2–1 || –
|- align="center" bgcolor="ffbbb"
| February 20 ||  || – || J. C. Love Field at Pat Patterson Park  || CUSA TV || 2–10 || Ethan Bates (1–0) || Carter Smith (0–1) || None || 1,748 || 2–2 || –
|- align="center" bgcolor="ffbbb"
| February 22 || at Louisiana || – || M. L. Tigue Moore Field at Russo Park  || None || 3–4 || Blake Marshall (1–0) || Jake Porter (0–1) || None || 3,896 || 2–3 || –
|- align="center" bgcolor="ffbbb"
| February 23 || at Louisiana || – || M. L. Tigue Moore Field at Russo Park || ESPN+ || 0–11 || Tommy Ray (1–0) || Jack Sterner (1–1) || None || 3,771 || 2–4 || –
|- align="center" bgcolor="ffbbb"
| February 24 || at Louisiana || – || M. L. Tigue Moore Field at Russo Park || None || 1–2 || Blake Marshall (2–0) || Mason Olsen (0–1) || None || 4,098 || 2–5 || –
|- align="center" bgcolor="ffbbb"
| February 25 || at Louisiana || – || M. L. Tigue Moore Field at Russo Park || ESPN+ || 10–11 || Cooper Rawls (2–0) || Jake Porter (0–2) || Carson Fluno (1) || 4,139 || 2–6 || –
|- align="center" bgcolor="cccccc"
| February 28 || at Utah Valley || – || UCCU Ballpark || WAC DN || colspan=7|  Cancelled- Snowstorm
|- align="center" bgcolor="ffbbb"
|-

|- align="center" bgcolor="ccffcc"
| March 2 || Omaha || – || Larry H. Miller Field || byutv.org || 12–11 (10) || Sam Beck (1–0) || Rans Sanders (0–1) || None || 854 || 3–6 || –
|- align="center" bgcolor="ccffcc"
| March 3 || Omaha || – || Larry H. Miller Field || byutv.org || 8–4 || Bryce Robison (1–0) || Luke Gainer (0–2) || None || 955 || 4–6 || –
|- align="center" bgcolor="ffbbb"
| March 4 || Omaha || – || Larry H. Miller Field || byutv.org || 4–16 || Charlie Bell (1–1) || Cutter Clawson (1–1) || None || 1,206 || 4–7 || –
|- align="center" 
| March 7 || at Utah Tech || – || Bruce Hurst Field || ESPN+ || – || – || – || – || – || – || –
|- align="center" 
| March 9 || at Creighton || – || Charles Schwab Field Omaha  || FloBaseball || – || – || – || – || – || – || –
|- align="center" 
| March 10 || at Creighton || – || Charles Schwab Field Omaha  || FloBaseball || – || – || – || – || – || – || –
|- align="center" 
| March 11 || at Creighton || – || Charles Schwab Field Omaha  || FloBaseball || – || – || – || – || – || – || –
|- align="center" 
| March 14 || Utah || – || Larry H. Miller Field || byutv.org || – || – || – || – || – || – || –
|- align="center" 
| March 16 || * || – || George C. Page Stadium  || WCC Net || – || – || – || – || – || – || –
|- align="center" 
| March 17 || * || – || George C. Page Stadium || WCC Net || – || – || – || – || – || – || – 
|- align="center" 
| March 18 || * || – || George C. Page Stadium || WCC Net || – || – || – || – || – || – || –
|- align="center" 
| March 21 || Utah Valley || – || Larry H. Miller Field  || byutv.org || – || – || – || – || – || – || –
|- align="center" 
| March 23 || Saint Mary's* || – || Larry H. Miller Field  || BYUtv || – || – || – || – || – || – || – 
|- align="center" 
| March 24 || Saint Mary's* || – || Larry H. Miller Field  || byutv.org || – || – || – || – || – || – || – 
|- align="center" 
| March 25 || Saint Mary's || – || Larry H. Miller Field  || byutv.org || – || – || – || – || – || – || –  
|- align="center" 
| March 28 || at Utah Valley || – || UCCU Ballpark  || ESPN+ || – || – || – || – || – || – || –
|- align="center" 
| March 30 || at Gonzaga* || – || Patterson Baseball Complex || WCC Net || – || – || – || – || – || – || –
|- align="center" 
| March 31 || at Gonzaga* || – || Patterson Baseball Complex || WCC Net || – || – || – || – || – || – || –
|-

|- align="center" 
| April 1 || at Gonzaga* || – || Patterson Baseball Complex || WCC Net || – || – || – || – || – || – || –
|- align="center" 
| April 3 || at Washington State || – || Bailey–Brayton Field  || P12 || – || – || – || – || – || – || –
|- align="center" 
| April 6 ||San Francisco* || – || Larry H. Miller Field  || byutv.org || – || – || – || – || – || – || –  
|- align="center" 
| April 7 || San Francisco* || – || Larry H. Miller Field  || byutv.org || – || – || – || – || – || – || –  
|- align="center" 
| April 8 || San Francisco* || – || Larry H. Miller Field  || byutv.org || – || – || – || – || – || – || –  
|- align="center" 
| April 11 || Utah Tech || – || Larry H. Miller Field  || byutv.org || – || – || – || – || – || – || –  
|- align="center" 
| April 13 || at Santa Clara* || – || Stephen Schott Stadium  || WCC Net || – || – || – || – || – || – || –
|- align="center" 
| April 14 || at Santa Clara* || – || Stephen Schott Stadium || WCC Net || – || – || – || – || – || – || –
|- align="center" 
| April 15 || at Santa Clara*|| – || Stephen Schott Stadium || WCC Net || – || – || – || – || – || – || –
|- align="center" 
| April 18 || Utah || – || Larry H. Miller Field  || byutv.org || – || – || – || – || – || – || –  
|- align="center" 
| April 20 || UNCG || – || Larry H. Miller Field || BYUtv || – || – || – || – || – || – || –
|- align="center" 
| April 21 || UNCG || – || Larry H. Miller Field || byutv.org || – || – || – || – || – || – || –
|- align="center" 
| April 22 || UNCG || – || Larry H. Miller Field || BYUtv || – || – || – || – || – || – || –
|- align="center" 
| April 27 || Portland* || – || Larry H. Miller Field || byutv.org || – || – || – || – || – || – || –
|- align="center" 
| April 28 || Portland || – || Larry H. Miller Field || BYUtv || – || – || – || – || – || – || –
|- align="center" 
| April 29 || Portland || – || Larry H. Miller Field || BYUtv || – || – || – || – || – || – || –
|-

|- align="center" 
| May 2 || at UC San Diego || – || Triton Ballpark  || ESPN+ || – || – || – || – || – || – || –
|- align="center" 
| May 4 || at San Diego* || – || Fowler Park || WCC Net || – || – || – || – || – || – || –
|- align="center" 
| May 5 || at San Diego* || – || Fowler Park || WCC Net || – || – || – || – || – || – || –
|- align="center" 
| May 6 || at San Diego* || – || Fowler Park || WCC Net || – || – || – || – || – || – || –
|- align="center" 
| May 9 || at Utah || – || Smith's Ballpark || P12 || – || – || – || – || – || – || –
|- align="center" 
| May 11 || at Pacific* || – || Klein Family Field  || WCC Net  || – || – || – || – || – || – || –
|- align="center" 
| May 12 || at Pacific* || – || Klein Family Field  || WCC Net  || – || – || – || – || – || – || –
|- align="center" 
|May 13 || at Pacific* || – || Klein Family Field  || WCC Net  || – || – || – || – || – || – || –
|- align="center"
|May 18 || Pepperdine* || – || Larry H. Miller Field || byutv.org || – || – || – || – || – || – || –
|- align="center" 
|May 19 || Pepperdine* || – || Larry H. Miller Field || BYUtv || – || – || – || – || – || – || –
|- align="center" 
|May 20 || Pepperdine* || – || Larry H. Miller Field || BYUtv || – || – || – || – || – || – || –
|-

|- align="center" 
|May 24 || * || – || Banner Island Ballpark || WCC Net ||  – || – || – || – || – || – || –
|-

| style="font-size:88%" | Rankings from Collegiate Baseball. Parenthesis indicate tournament seedings.*West Coast Conference games

Rivalries
BYU has two main rivalries on their schedule- the Deseret First Duel vs. Utah and the UCCU Crosstown Clash vs. Utah Valley. Utah Tech (formerly Dixie State) also plays the Cougars for a third consecutive season.

Radio Information
BYU Baseball was once again broadcast as part of the NuSkin BYU Sports Network. BYU Radio 107.9 KUMT serves as the flagship station. However, due to conflicts, Game 2 on February 18 (Louisiana Tech) and April 1 (Gonzaga) will be byuradio.org exclusives. Jason Shepherd and Greg Wrubell will once again rotate providing play-by-play. Tuckett Slade will serve as the analyst on select broadcasts.

TV Announcers
Louisiana Tech: Dave Nitz
Louisiana Tech DH: Dave Nitz
Louisiana Tech: Dave Nitz
Louisiana: Dan McDonald & Brennan Breaux
Louisiana: Dan McDonald & Brennan Breaux
Omaha: Jason Shepherd
Omaha: Jason Shepherd
Omaha: Jason Shepherd
Utah Tech: 
Creighton: 
Creighton: 
Creighton: 
Utah: 
Loyola Marymount: 
Loyola Marymount: 
Loyola Marymount: 
Utah Valley: 
Saint Mary's: 
Saint Mary's: 
Saint Mary's: 
Utah Valley: 
Gonzaga: 
Gonzaga: 
Gonzaga: 
Washington State: 
San Francisco: 
San Francisco: 
San Francisco: 
Utah Tech: 
Santa Clara: 
Santa Clara: 
Santa Clara: 
Utah: 
UNCG: 
UNCG: 
UNCG: 
Portland: 
Portland: 
Portland: 
UC San Diego: 
San Diego: 
San Diego:
San Diego: 
Utah: 
Pacific: 
Pacific: 
Pacific: 
Pepperdine: 
Pepperdine: 
Pepperdine:

See also 
 2022 BYU Cougars football team
 2022–23 BYU Cougars men's basketball team
 2022–23 BYU Cougars women's basketball team
 2022 BYU Cougars women's soccer team
 2022 BYU Cougars women's volleyball team
 2023 BYU Cougars men's volleyball team
 2023 BYU Cougars softball team

References 

2023 West Coast Conference baseball season
2023 team
2023 in sports in Utah